Eilean is a 70 foot ketch designed and built in 1936 by William Fife. 
She was built for the Fulton brothers, who were Scottish steel merchants. The yacht was at some time in the 1960s owned by Hartley Shawcross, who sold her to a yacht charter business in English Harbour, Antigua. She was featured in the music video of the 1982 song "Rio" by British pop band Duran Duran.

In 2006, Angelo Bonati, the CEO of Italian watch manufacturer Panerai saw the boat in English Harbour in a state of disrepair. Bonati arranged for the yacht to be restored. The boat was sent to a shipyard in Italy for restoration. She was re-launched in 2009 as part of an advertising campaign for the Panerai brand. In 2012, some members of original Duran Duran lineup were present when Eilean was included in a "classic yacht regatta" in Antigua.

See also
 Drum (yacht)

References

External links
 "Eilean" website
 "William Fife Eilean" Classic Sailboats.

Individual yachts